Princess Anne High School (PAHS) is one of 11 high schools in the Virginia Beach City Public School System. Opened in 1954, it is the oldest remaining high school in Virginia Beach, Virginia, United States. The school is named after the now extinct Princess Anne County, Virginia (itself named after the British Royal, Queen Anne, titled at the time and prior to ascension, Princess of Denmark) which was annexed with the founding of Virginia Beach. Princess Anne High School is slated to be demolished following the construction of a replacement building. The construction is anticipated to begin in 2023 with the new building being open in 2028. The demolishing of the building will end its 74 year history.

History

Origins
The school was built during a period of rapid expansion of the then Princess Anne County. The cost of construction and equipment was $3,500,000, which included approximately $1,000,000 of federal funds. The school was first occupied in September 1954. Several schools had previously been built and remain in use today, however, they were converted to smaller middle or elementary schools in order to address ballooning class sizes. In 1963, Princess Anne County was incorporated into the newly formed City of Virginia Beach and thus PAHS became the oldest remaining high school in the system.

September 1, 1995 fire
Four days before the opening of school in September 1995, a fire destroyed approximately one-third of the building. The blaze began in the library, destroying numerous valuable records, among them the entire collection of PA yearbooks before 1995 and numerous printed and digital course materials collected by teachers throughout their careers. The exact cause of the fire has never been announced.

Throughout both the 1995-1996 school year and the 1996-1997 fall semester, classes were held in a nearby vacant shopping mall known as "Celebration Station", which has since been demolished. Shuttle buses transported students between the temporary location and the remaining, intact portion of the school/portable classrooms on the main campus.

Following the fire, a large portion of the school was entirely rebuilt. As a result, the PA library now maintains one of the most extensive and up-to-date media collections of any Virginia Beach high school. A new wing was also added for art classes and studios. The school reopened in January 1997, with the official re-dedication ceremony held on May 4, 1997.

Academics
The school is part of the Virginia Beach Public School System, which has a reputation of being the best in the Hampton Roads region. Princess Anne maintained its place as the highest ranked high school in Virginia Beach as well as the Hampton Roads region in the Newsweek listing of "America's Best High Schools", continuing to place in the list annually (#451 in 2012, #263 in 2011, #123 in 2010, #167 in 2008 and #213 in 2007). In 2012, The Washington Post released its list for "America's Most Challenging High Schools", and all eleven Virginia Beach City High Schools were in the top 1,900, but Princess Anne held the highest rank by a significant margin at #250. The only Virginia Beach high school International Baccalaureate program is housed in PA, attracting gifted students from throughout Virginia Beach.https://www.vbschools.com/UserFiles/Servers/Server_78010/File/About%20Us/Our%20Leadership/Our%20Departments/Budget/Budget%20Breakdown/CIP2020.pdf

The school has excelled in the VHSL academic competitions, with numerous championships in forensics and debate.

On GreatSchools, the school's overall rating is 7/10; college readiness being a 9/10; test scores a 7/10, and equity being a 4/10.

Special programs
In addition to serving regularly zoned students and the International Baccalaureate program, the school hosts the Virginia Beach center for students with moderate to severe disabilities (located within the "West Building") and used to host a citywide center for pregnant teenagers (The "PA Center"), which now is located in the Renaissance Academy. Princess Anne is also one of the few high schools in Virginia Beach with an NJROTC program.

Athletics
Princess Anne has won 27 team VHSL State team sports championships and 19 State individual sports championships. 22 of the team titles have come since 1999. PA students participate in the following sports, in accordance with the Virginia High School League (VHSL):

Princess Anne's golf team won the Virginia State High School Golf Championship in 1971 and 1972. The team was notable in that it included Curtis Strange ('73), Allan Strange ('73), Phil Stewart ('73) and Jay Williams ('72). All went on to become PGA golf professionals.

Princess Anne's women's basketball team won the VHSL State Championship eight consecutive years (2014–21), which had never been previously accomplished. The team has won 13 championships, all since 2002. The most recent title came in March 2023, with a win over L.C. Byrd.

Princess Anne's men's volleyball team won the VHSL State Championship three consecutive years from 2013-2015.

Princess Anne's women's volleyball team won the VHSL State Championship in 2018.

Club sports including lacrosse and crew have recently been founded, since the Virginia Beach school system does not formally participate in them. Informal extramural competitions between other local clubs and varsity teams of private institutions are common.

A long-standing club of athletic trainers allows students to voluntarily assist local team trainers and physicians.

School activities

 Anime Club
 Art Club
 Art National Honor Society
 Asian Cultural Experience
 Athletic Trainers
 Band Column 1
 Breaking the Chain
 Cavalier Circle for Kings Daughters
 Cavalier Club
 Chess Club
 Chorus
 Color Guard
 Computer Club
 Crew Club
 Debate Team
 Delta Epsilon Chi (DECA)
 Drama
 Drama Club
 Drug Abuse Resistance Education (DARE)
 The Fabulous Marching Cavaliers (marching band)
 Family, Career and Community Leaders of America
 Fashion Club
 Film Club
 Finer Things Literature Club
 Forensics Team
 French Club
 French National Honor Society
 Freshman Class Council
 Future Business Leaders of America (FBLA)
 Future Educators of America (FEA)
 Gay/Straight Alliance
 German Club
 German National Honor Society
 Gifted Advisory Board
 Global Outreach
 Indoor drum line
 Interact Club
 International Baccalaureate Student Organization (IBSO)
 Japanese Club
 Jazz band
 Junior Class Council
 Junior Engineering Technical Society (JETS)
 Key Club (Kiwanis)
 Knitting Club
 Lacrosse Club
 Latin Club
 Latin National Honor Society
 Medical and Legal Society
 Model United Nations
 National Engineering Design Challenge (NEDC)
 National Honor Society
 Naval Junior Reserve Officers' Training Corps (NJROTC)
 Operation Smile
 Optimist Club
 Orchestra
 The Page (student newspaper)
 Partners Club
 Photography/Print Club
 Poetry Club
 Relay for Life
 Resources for Academic Achievement (REACH)
 Rock Orchestra
 Rocketry Club
 Scholastic Bowl
 Science Bowl
 A Season for Nonviolence
 Senior Class Council
 Sophomore Class Council
 Spanish Club
 Spanish National Honor Society
 STEM Robotics Club
 Student Crime Solvers
 Student Council Association
 Students for Environmental Action (SEA)
 Teen Readers
 Teens in Prayer
 Technology Student Association
 Thespian Troupe 1762
 Weight Lifting Club
 World of Work Club
 Yearbook
 Young Democrats
 Young Libertarians
 Young Life
 Young Republicans
Step 
Dancing Cavalettes

Location and district
Princess Anne is centrally located within the city of Virginia Beach along Virginia Beach Blvd. The school is adjacent to the recently erected downtown area ("Town Center"). The two middle schools that feed into the student body include portions of Independence Middle School and Plaza Middle School. This includes portions of the Thoroughgood, Thalia, Pembroke, Lynnhaven, Princess Anne Plaza and Windsor Woods neighborhoods. Additionally, due to the International Baccalaureate programme, those under the IB Middle Years Programme automatically feed into Princess Anne, assuming they have completed the respective requirements. Also, a nearby gifted middle school, Kemps Landing Magnet School, tends to feed heavily into its International Baccalaureate programme.

Notable alumni
Tim Finchem, (1965) - PGA Tour commissioner
Daniel Hudson, (2005) - Major League Baseball pitcher
 Cedric Humes, (2002) - Virginia Tech football running back; drafted by Pittsburgh Steelers in Round 7, 240th pick of 2006 NFL Draft
Todd Nathanson — (better known as Todd In the Shadows) Internet pop music reviewer
Juice Newton - pop/country singer; attended Princess Anne High School but graduated from the new First Colonial High School)
 Curtis Strange - two-time US Open golf champion (1988, 1989); member of the World Golf Hall of Fame
Frank Wagner - Virginia Senator
Elizabeth Williams (2010) - basketball player, Atlanta Dream WNBA center
Pharrell Williams (1992) - singer, songwriter, rapper, N*E*R*D frontman and producer in "The Neptunes"
Tara Buckman  (1974)-retired film and television actress

See also
AAA Eastern Region
AAA Beach District

References

Virginia Beach schools
School Report Card

External links
Official Princess Anne High School website
About PAHS: History
Frappr Student Alumni location map
PAHS Clubs home page
VHSL-Reference
Crew Team website
FMC website
VB SCHOOL CAPITAL IMPORVEMENT PLAN

Educational institutions established in 1954
High schools in Virginia Beach, Virginia
International Baccalaureate schools in Virginia
Public high schools in Virginia
1954 establishments in Virginia
History of Virginia Beach, Virginia